The ninth season of the reality television series Love & Hip Hop: Atlanta first aired on VH1 from March 16, 2020 until May 11, 2020. The show was primarily filmed in Atlanta, Georgia. It is executive produced by Mona Scott-Young and Stephanie R. Gayle for Monami Entertainment and Dan Cesareo, Lucilla D'Agostino, Donna Edge Rachell, Jamail Shelton, Paris Bauldwin and Emily Terkell for Big Fish Entertainment. Nina L. Diaz, Sitarah Pendelton, Lashan Browning and Phakiso Collins are executive producers for VH1. 

The series chronicles the lives of several women and men in the Atlanta area, involved in hip hop music.

Production
Season nine of Love & Hip Hop: Atlanta began filming in December 2019.

On February 17, 2020, VH1 announced Love & Hip Hop: Atlanta would be returning for a ninth season on March 16, 2020. New cast members would include Alexis Skyy, Ki'yomi Leslie and LightSkinKeisha. Scrapp Deleon's sister Cheyenne also appears in a minor supporting role, with Love & Hip Hop: New Yorks Erica Mena and Safaree Samuels making special crossover appearances during the season.

Production on the season was affected by the 2019–20 coronavirus pandemic, with cast members filming their green screen confessional scenes while quarantined at home (as seen from the season's fourth episode onwards). The ninth episode would act as the season's finale, and include scenes of the show's behind-the-scenes struggles as production was forcibly shut down. The remaining episodes of the season were postposed indefinitely due to the virus.

Synopsis

Cast

Starring

 Rasheeda (6 episodes) 
 Mimi Faust (9 episodes)
 Karlie Redd (9 episodes) 
 Spice (9 episodes) 
 Scrapp DeLeon (6 episodes) 
 Yung Joc (8 episodes) 
 Lil Scrappy (8 episodes) 
 Sierra Gates (8 episodes) 
 Stevie J (3 episodes)

Also starring

 Momma Dee (6 episodes) 
 Shooter Gates (9 episodes) 
 Kendra Robinson (5 episodes) 
 Kirk Frost (7 episodes) 
 BK Brasco (6 episodes) 
 Alexis Skyy (5 episodes) 
 LightSkinKeisha (4 episodes) 
 Shekinah Anderson (7 episodes) 
 Akbar V (5 episodes) 
 Bambi Benson (9 episodes) 
 Ki'yomi Leslie (5 episodes)
 Tokyo Vanity (4 episodes)
 Karen King (4 episodes)
 Cee Cee (3 episodes)
 Cheyenne Robinson (6 episodes)
 Safaree Samuels (3 episodes) 
 Erica Mena (3 episodes) 

Ernest Bryant, Shirleen Harvell, Erica Dixon and Sharonda Official return in guest roles.

Episodes

Webisodes

Check Yourself
Love & Hip Hop Atlanta: Check Yourself, which features the cast's reactions to each episode, was released weekly with every episode on digital platforms.

Bonus scenes
Deleted scenes from the season's episodes were released weekly as bonus content on VH1's official website.

References

External links

2020 American television seasons
Love & Hip Hop